Chris Best (born April 3, 1983) is a former Canadian football guard who played 10 seasons for the Saskatchewan Roughriders of the Canadian Football League. He played CIS Football at Waterloo, as well as playing four seasons in the United States at Duke University.  He graduated from Duke University in 2005 with a degree in Mechanical Engineering, and is currently finishing his master's degree from the University of Waterloo.

He won the 101st Grey Cup with the Roughriders in 2013.

External links
Saskatchewan Roughriders bio 
 

1983 births
Living people
Canadian football offensive linemen
Duke University Pratt School of Engineering alumni
Canadian football people from Calgary
Players of Canadian football from Alberta
Saskatchewan Roughriders players
University of Waterloo alumni
Waterloo Warriors football players